Oberschützen ( derived from "Felső"=upper, "Lövő"=shooter) is a town in the district of Oberwart in the Austrian state of Burgenland.

Subdivisions
 Aschau im Burgenland
 Oberschützen
 Schmiedrait
 Unterschützen
 Willersdorf

Population

See also 
 Lövő,  a town in Hungary

References

Cities and towns in Oberwart District